

117001–117100 

|-id=020
| 117020 Janeconlin ||  || Jane Conlin (born 1946), an American activist and humanitarian. She has sponsored several of the original Sudanese lost boys and is quick to lend a hand to anyone in need. She is a committed climate activist, working tirelessly as a group leader for Citizens Climate Lobby in Arizona. || 
|-id=032
| 117032 Davidlane ||  || David Lane (born 1963), a Canadian amateur astronomer, supernova hunter, and author of The Earth Centered Universe (a planetarium and telescope-control program) || 
|-id=086
| 117086 Lóczy ||  || Lajos Lóczy (1849–1920), a Hungarian geologist, first western geologist to describe the structure, geomorphology and stratigraphy of the mountain chains bordering the Tibetan Plateau || 
|-id=093
| 117093 Umbria ||  || The Italian region of Umbria is characterized by rolling green hills and medieval cities rich in history and traditions. || 
|}

117101–117200 

|-id=156
| 117156 Altschwendt ||  || The Austrian village of Altschwendt, where the Altschwendt Observatory  is located. It was the first made minor-planet discovery at the observatory. || 
|}

117201–117300 

|-id=240
| 117240 Zhytomyr ||  || Zhytomyr, Ukraine, the oblast in which Andrushivka, the discovery site, is found, and the birthplace of Sergej Korolev, Russian rocket engineer || 
|}

117301–117400 

|-id=329
| 117329 Spencer ||  || Henry Spencer (born 1955), Canadian computer scientist and small-satellite engineer || 
|-id=350
| 117350 Saburo ||  || Saburo Itagaki (1916–1983), father of Japanese amateur astronomer Koichi Itagaki who discovered this minor planet || 
|-id=381
| 117381 Lindaweiland || 2004 YU || Linda Weiland, American zoning administrator of Cochise County, Arizona, who has campaigned against light pollution || 
|-id=384
| 117384 Halharrison ||  || Hal Harrison (born 1947) is an amateur astronomer and photographer and has always been fascinated by planetary science and astronomy. || 
|-id=386
| 117386 Thomasschlapkohl ||  || Thomas Schlapkohl (born 1987) is a guidance, navigation and control engineer at Lockheed Martin for the OSIRIS-REx asteroid sample-return mission. || 
|-id=387
| 117387 Javiercerna ||  || Javier Cerna (born 1981), a Telecom engineer for the OSIRIS-REx asteroid sample-return mission. He was also a Telecom engineer on the GRAIL Discovery program and InSight Mars-lander. || 
|-id=388
| 117388 Jamiemoore ||  || Jamie Moore (born 1986), a flight system contamination control engineer and spacecraft-curation interface at Lockheed Martin for the OSIRIS-REx asteroid sample-return mission. She has supported multiple NASA interplanetary missions helping to ensure that contamination control requirements are met. || 
|-id=390
| 117390 Stephanegendron ||  || Stéphane Gendron (born 1963) is Materials and Thermal Engineer at the Canadian Space Agency (CSA) and he acted as the CSA Thermal Engineer in the project OLA, a sophisticated Lidar instrument provided by CSA for the OSIRIS-REx asteroid sample-return mission. || 
|}

117401–117500 

|-id=406
| 117406 Blasgámez ||  || Blas Gámez Ortiz (1966–2017), a decorated officer of the Spanish National Police Corps, who was killed in the line of duty. || 
|-id=413
| 117413 Ramonycajal ||  || Santiago Ramón y Cajal (1852–1934), Spanish physician and Nobel laureate || 
|-id=430
| 117430 Achosyx ||  || "Achosyx", (French pronunciation of "H-O-6"), is the IAU observatory code  of the discovering Rent-A-Scope Observatory (Remote Astronomy Society Observatory) located in Mayhill, New Mexico. || 
|-id=435
| 117435 Severochoa ||  || Severo Ochoa (1905–1993), Spanish-born American biochemist and winner of the 1959 Nobel Prize for Physiology or Medicine || 
|-id=439
| 117439 Rosner ||  || Arnie and Nancy Rosner, American photographers from Fountain Valley, California. Arnie is an astrophotographer; and Nancy is a travel photographer. || 
|}

117501–117600 

|-id=506
| 117506 Wildberg ||  || The German town of Wildberg, where the Wildberg Observatory  is located || 
|-id=539
| 117539 Celletti ||  || Alessandra Celletti (born 1962), Italian mathematician who teaches celestial mechanics at University of Rome Tor Vergata || 
|-id=568
| 117568 Yadame ||  || Yadame Yoshikazu (born 1943), a farmer in the Kitami region of Hokkaido, founded the Kitami Astronomical Society in 1963 || 
|-id=572
| 117572 Hutsebaut ||  || Robert Hutsebaut (born 1941), Belgian amateur astronomer and a discoverer of minor planets || 
|-id=581
| 117581 Devinschrader ||  || Devin Schrader (born 1984) is a meteoriticist and cosmochemist, and is an assistant director of the Center for Meteorite Studies at Arizona State University and a science collaborator with the Carbonaceous Meteorite Working Group for the OSIRIS-REx asteroid sample-return mission. || 
|-id=582
| 117582 Kenjikawai ||  || Kenji Kawai (born 1957) is a Japanese composer, musician, and conductor who has written music for numerous movies, television programs and video games. || 
|-id=586
| 117586 Twilatho ||  || Twila Gore Peck (born 1949) and Thom Peck (born 1950), American astronomy communicators. Thom has been president of astronomy clubs in several cities, while Twila has organized observing sessions and public astronomy events. || 
|-id=595
| 117595 Jemmadavidson ||  || Jemma Davidson (born 1984) is a cosmochemist and meteoriticist specializing in the study of presolar grains and pristine chondrites to determine how minor bodies formed and evolved in the early Solar System. She was previously a Science Team collaborator and webmaster for the OSIRIS-REx asteroid sample-return mission. || 
|-id=596
| 117596 Richardkuhns ||  || Richard Kuhns (born 1972), manager with the OSIRIS-REx asteroid sample-return mission for the Lockheed Martin Space Systems Company. Previously he was the avionics manager for the WorldView-4 (GeoEye-2) spacecraft, and a manager for Lockheed Martin Coherent Technologies. His experience includes work in machine vision and adaptive optics. || 
|}

117601–117700 

|-id=610
| 117610 Keithmahoney ||  || Keith Mahoney (born 1970) was the flight system Guidance, Navigation, and Control LIDAR engineer at Lockheed Martin for the OSIRIS-REx asteroid sample-return mission. || 
|-id=614
| 117614 Hannahmclain ||  || Hannah McLain (born 1985) is an astrobiologist at the Goddard Space Flight Center supporting organic contamination analysis for the OSIRIS-REx asteroid sample-return mission. || 
|-id=640
| 117640 Millsellie ||  || Amelia Lucas (born 2014) and Eloise Thornton (born 2014) were born during the OSIRIS-REx asteroid sample-return mission. Mills, daughter of Kristen and Scott Lucas, and Ellie, daughter of Jennifer and Kevin Thornton, enjoy exploring new frontiers, hearing about the universe, and looking at stars with their grandparents Thomas and Karen Connors. || 
|-id=652
| 117652 Joséaponte ||  || José Aponte (born 1981) is an astrobiologist at the Goddard Space Flight Center for the OSIRIS-REx asteroid sample-return mission. His research emphasis is in organic chemistry in meteorites. || 
|-id=657
| 117657 Jamieelsila ||  || Jamie Elsila (born 1974) is an astrobiologist at the Goddard Space Flight Center for the OSIRIS-REx asteroid sample-return mission. Her research emphasis is in organic chemistry in meteorites and in spacecraft-returned samples from asteroids and comets. || 
|}

117701–117800 

|-id=703
| 117703 Ochoa ||  || Ellen Ochoa (born 1958) is a former American Astronaut. In 1993, she was the first Hispanic woman to go to space. She flew four space shuttle missions, logged nearly 1000 hours in space, and became Director of the Johnson Space Center. || 
|-id=704
| 117704 Lopez-Alegria ||  || Michael Lopez-Alegria (born 1958) is a retired astronaut who flew on four NASA missions aboard the Space Shuttle, the Soyuz spacecraft and the International Space Station. He performed ten spacewalks over his 257 days in space. While in space, he performed experiments on materials, biotechnology and combustion. || 
|-id=711
| 117711 Degenfeld || 2005 GA || Berta Degenfeld-Schomburg (1843–1928), Hungarian amateur astronomer who took part in the work of the Kiskartal Observatory || 
|-id=712
| 117712 Podmaniczky || 2005 GD || Baron Géza Podmaniczky (1839–1923), Hungarian landowner and amateur astronomer || 
|-id=713
| 117713 Kövesligethy ||  || Radó Kövesligethy (1862–1924), Hungarian astronomer and geophysicist || 
|-id=714
| 117714 Kiskartal ||  || Kiskartal Observatory was founded by Baron Géza Podmaniczky (see above) in 1884 || 
|-id=715
| 117715 Carlkirby ||  || Carl Kirby (born 1949), American amateur astronomer || 
|-id=736
| 117736 Sherrod ||  || Clay Sherrod (born 1949), American archaeologist, biomedical researcher, founder and director of the Arkansas Sky Observatory  || 
|-id=781
| 117781 Jamesfisher ||  || James Randall Fisher (born 1942), an author and Professor of English who earned a PhD at the University of Southern California || 
|}

117801–117900 

|-id=852
| 117852 Constance ||  || Constance L. Martin-Trembley (born 1962) has been a beloved and inspirational science teacher for over a decade. Connie has organized educational trips, run an after school book club and science club, and has a passion for astronomy. She was awarded Teacher of the year for her district in 2007. || 
|-id=874
| 117874 Picodelteide || 2511 P-L || Pico del Teide, active volcano on Tenerife, one of the Spanish Canary Islands. || 
|}

117901–118000 

|-id=993
| 117993 Zambujal || 1064 T-2 || Zambujal, Portugal, chalcolithic archaeological site || 
|-id=997
| 117997 Irazu || 1090 T-2 || Irazú, the 3432-m active volcano in Costa Rica. || 
|}

References 

117001-118000